Zieten was the name given to two wolfpacks of German U-boats that operated during the World War II Battle of the Atlantic in 1942, the first, larger and more successful was from 6 January 1942 to 22 January 1942, the second, smaller from 23 March to 29 March 1942.

It was named after Hans Joachim von Zieten (1699 - 1786), a German cavalry officer under Frederick the Great

Zieten 1
The group was responsible for sinking eleven merchant ships  and damaging a further three merchant ships .

Raiding History

U-boats

Zieten 2
The group had no success and lost one U-boat.

U-boats

References
Notes

Bibliography
 
 
 

Wolfpacks of 1942